Eliahu (Eli) Shamir is an Israeli mathematician and computer scientist, the Jean and Helene Alfassa Professor Emeritus of Computer Science at the Hebrew University of Jerusalem.

Biography
Shamir earned his Ph.D. from the Hebrew University in 1963, under the supervision of Shmuel Agmon. After briefly holding faculty positions at the University of California, Berkeley and Northwestern University, he returned to the Hebrew University in 1966, and was promoted to full professor in 1972.

Contributions
Shamir was one of the discoverers of the pumping lemma for context-free languages. He did research in partial differential equations, automata theory, random graphs, computational learning theory, and computational linguistics. He was (with Michael O. Rabin) one of the founders of the computer science program at the Hebrew University.

Awards and honors
He was given his named chair in 1987, and in 2002 a workshop on learning and formal verification was held in his honor at Neve Ilan, Israel.

Selected publications
.
.
.

References

External links
 

Year of birth missing (living people)
Living people
Israeli computer scientists
Israeli mathematicians
Theoretical computer scientists
Graph theorists
Einstein Institute of Mathematics alumni
University of California, Berkeley faculty
Northwestern University faculty
Academic staff of the Hebrew University of Jerusalem